is the second single of Asuka Hinoi. It was released on April 14, 2004, and reached position number 79 on the Oricon charts. It was written by the songwriter Hiromasa Ijichi.

Track listing
"Tatta Hitori no Kimi"
"Rock-n-Roll Army"
"Tatta Hitori no Kimi" (instrumental)
"Rock-n-Roll Army" (instrumental)

References 

2004 singles
2004 songs
Asuka Hinoi songs